The YMCA–Democrat Building is a historic commercial building at East Capitol and Scott Streets in downtown Little Rock, Arkansas.  It is a three-story masonry structure, built out of brick with molded stone trim.  Built in 1904, its restrained Renaissance Revival designs have been obscured to some extent by later alterations.  It was designed by Sanders & Gibb, a prominent local architectural firm, and originally housed the local YMCA before later becoming home to the Arkansas Democrat-Gazette, one of the state's leading newspapers.

The building was listed on the National Register of Historic Places in 1992.

See also
Little Rock Y.M.C.A., the 1928 YMCA building
National Register of Historic Places listings in Little Rock, Arkansas

References

Commercial buildings on the National Register of Historic Places in Arkansas
Renaissance Revival architecture in Arkansas
Buildings and structures completed in 1904
Buildings and structures in Little Rock, Arkansas
Clubhouses on the National Register of Historic Places in Arkansas
YMCA buildings in the United States